Scott Robert Hend (born 1973) is an Australian professional golfer who has played on a number of the world's main tours. He is renowned as a long hitter.

Professional career
Hend turned professional in 1997 and joined the PGA Tour of Australasia. He has since played on most of the major golf tours around the world. He has won three times in Australia, and was the inaugural winner of the Von Nida Tour Order of Merit in 2003. He has also won on the Canadian Tour, at the 2002 Victoria Open.

Hend played on the United States-based PGA Tour in 2004 and 2005, having gained his card at qualifying school for both seasons. In 2005, he was the first foreign player to win the 'Long Drive' statistic on the PGA Tour. Since 2007 he has played on the Asian Tour, winning for the first time in 2008 at the Indonesia President Invitational. He finished fourth on the Order of Merit in both 2007 and 2009, and in 2007 was named Rookie of the Year.

In June 2016, Hend won the Queen's Cup in Thailand by one stroke, for his ninth victory on the Asian Tour. This moved him up into a tie for third place on the all-time winners list, behind only Thaworn Wiratchant and Thongchai Jaidee. He went on to win the 2016 Asian Tour Order of Merit.

Hend won his third European Tour title in March 2019 at the Maybank Championship. This was also his tenth victory on the Asian Tour, in a co-sanctioned event. He won the event in a dramatic playoff with Nacho Elvira, making a birdie at the first extra hole.

Professional wins (15)

European Tour wins (3)

1Co-sanctioned by the Asian Tour

European Tour playoff record (2–2)

Asian Tour wins (10)

*Note: The 2012 ISPS Handa Singapore Classic was shortened to 54 holes due to weather.
1Co-sanctioned by the European Tour

Asian Tour playoff record (2–2)

Canadian Tour wins (1)

Von Nida Tour wins (2)

Australasian Development Tour wins (1)

Other wins (1)
1999 South Australian PGA Championship (Foundation Tour)

Results in major championships
Results not in chronological order in 2020.

CUT = missed the half-way cut
"T" = tied for place
NT = No tournament due to COVID-19 pandemic

Results in World Golf Championships
Results not in chronological order before 2015.

1Cancelled due to COVID-19 pandemic

NT = no tournament
"T" = tied

See also
2003 PGA Tour Qualifying School graduates
2004 PGA Tour Qualifying School graduates
List of golfers with most Asian Tour wins

References

External links

Australian male golfers
PGA Tour golfers
European Tour golfers
Asian Tour golfers
PGA Tour of Australasia golfers
Olympic golfers of Australia
Golfers at the 2016 Summer Olympics
Golfers from Brisbane
Sportspeople from Townsville
Sportsmen from Queensland
People from Ponte Vedra Beach, Florida
1973 births
Living people